The 2013–14 Japan Figure Skating Championships took place on December 20–23, 2013 at the Saitama Super Arena in Saitama. It was the 82nd edition of the event. Medals were awarded in the disciplines of men's singles, ladies' singles, pair skating, and ice dancing.

Results

Men

Ladies

Pairs

Ice dancing

Japan Junior Figure Skating Championships
The 2013–14 Junior Championships took place on November 22–24, 2013 at the Nippon Gaishi Sports Plaza in Nagoya. Except for pairs, which took part along with the senior competition.

Men

Ladies

Pairs

Ice dancing

International team selections

Winter Olympics
The Olympic team was announced as follows:

World Championships
The World Championships team was announced as follows:

Four Continents Championships
The Four Continents Championships team was announced as follows:

World Junior Championships
The World Junior Championships team was announced as follows:

References

External links
 2013–14 Japan Figure Skating Championships results

Japan Figure Skating Championships
Japan Championships
Figure Skating Championships
Sport in Saitama (city)